The Takhti Stadium (Vârzeshgah-e Taxti) formerly known as Bagh Shomal Stadium  (Vârzeshgah-e Baq Shomal) is a multi-use stadium in Tabriz, Iran. It is currently used mostly for football matches and is the home stadium of Iran Pro League team Machine Sazi. The stadium holds 25,000 people. Iran Team Melli's largest ever victory took place in this stadium, in the match against Guam on 24 November 2000 in which Iran won by 19–0.

Important games

AFC Asian Cup 1976
On 1976, part of 1976 AFC Asian Cup games held in Bagh Shomal Stadium. The field of six teams was split into two groups of three. The games of Group A, including Kuwait, China PR and Malaysia were hosted by Tabriz.

Iran National Football Team
Takhti Stadium was also hosted some of Iran national football team matches, including the first round of 2002 World Cup qualification, and the 2002 LG Cup tournament which was held among the football national teams of Iran, Paraguay, Morocco and South Africa.
Takhti Stadium has played host to the friendly matches involving the Iran national football team.

Other National Football Team

See also
 Sahand Stadium
 Marzdaran Stadium
 Bonyan Dizel Stadium
 Tractor Stadium

Notes
 Iran national football team won at Penalty.
 Official name.
 Pre-revolutionary name and still common among native peoples.

References

AFC Asian Cup stadiums
Football venues in Iran
Sports venues in Tabriz
Sports venues completed in 1950